Goruk Kandi (also Romanized as Gorūk Kandī; also known as Jahāngīrābād) is a village in Qarah Su Rural District, in the Central District of Khoy County, West Azerbaijan Province, Iran. At the 2006 census, its population was 23, in 5 families.

References 

Populated places in Khoy County